The 2019 East–West Shrine Game was the 94th staging of the all–star college football exhibition to benefit Shriners Hospital for Children. The game was played at Tropicana Field in St. Petersburg, Florida, on January 19, 2019, with a 3:00 PM EST kickoff, televised on the NFL Network. It was one of the final 2018–19 bowl games concluding the 2018 FBS football season. The game featured NCAA players (predominantly from the Football Bowl Subdivision) and a few select invitees from Canadian university football, rostered into "East" and "West" teams.

The game featured more than 100 players from the 2018 NCAA Division I FBS football season and prospects for the 2019 draft of the professional National Football League (NFL). In the week prior to the game, scouts from all 32 NFL teams attended team practices. Coaches and game officials were supplied by the NFL.

The day before the game, the East–West Shrine Game Pat Tillman Award was given to Cody Barton (LB, Utah); the award "is presented to a player who best exemplifies character, intelligence, sportsmanship and service. The award is about a student-athlete's achievements and conduct, both on and off the field."

Coaching staffs
In early January 2019, head coaches were announced; Sam Mills III, defensive line coach for the Carolina Panthers, and Adam Zimmer, linebackers coach for the Minnesota Vikings, for the East and West teams, respectively. Each head coach had a support staff of 13 coaches.

Players
Players who accepted invitations to the game are listed on the official website; selected players are listed below.

East team
Full roster online here.

West team
Full roster online here.

Game summary

Scoring summary

Statistics

See also
2019 NFL Draft

References

Further reading

External links
Box score at ESPN
Game summary at shrinegame.com
Television promo (0:30) via YouTube
Television promo (1:00) via YouTube
2019 East-West Shrine Game highlights via YouTube

East West Shrine Game
East–West Shrine Bowl
American football in Florida
Sports competitions in St. Petersburg, Florida
January 2019 sports events in the United States
East-West Shrine Game